The Mark W. Michael Unit (MI) is a Texas Department of Criminal Justice men's prison located in unincorporated Anderson County, Texas. The unit is in proximity to Palestine and the Rusk ironworks, and it is in about a one-hour driving distance from Dallas.

The Michael Unit opened in September 1987. Texas officials referred to the facility as "model for the future." Robert Perkinson, author of Texas Tough: The Rise of America's Prison Empire, described Michael as "one of the meanest lockups" in Texas.

Operations
Michael was one of the first prisons to no longer use the "telephone-pole" layout, which has central pickets with dead-end cell blocks extending from them. The telephone-pole layout, while inexpensive to build, is difficult to police without building tenders, convicts paid to police other convicts. Instead Michael uses a modular pod design, which allows for riot control and visual surveillance. Most pods have double-bunk, reinforced concrete cells with security features such as slit windows and bolted-down metal toilets. Some pods have dormitories. Michael was one of several new prisons to have the ability to have many prisoners in extended lockdowns. State officials said that Michael's features allowing for extended lockdowns of prisoners were modeled on the United States Penitentiary, Marion.

Notable prisoners

Former:
 Michael Morton - Exonerated of the crime which he was convicted of. He was transferred to Michael after obtaining his master's degree.
 Steven Jay Russell - The prisoner is a character in the film I Love You Phillip Morris
 Elmer Wayne Henley

References

External links

 "Michael Unit." Texas Department of Criminal Justice.

Prisons in Anderson County, Texas
1987 establishments in Texas